Goldfinger may refer to:

James Bond 
 Goldfinger (novel), a 1959 James Bond novel written by Ian Fleming
 Goldfinger (film), a 1964 James Bond film starring Sean Connery
 Goldfinger (soundtrack), the soundtrack to the film composed by John Barry
 "Goldfinger" (Shirley Bassey song), the title song of the film performed by Shirley Bassey
 Auric Goldfinger, the eponymous villain of the novel and film Goldfinger
 Goldfinger (adventure), for the role-playing game James Bond 007

Music 
 Goldfinger (band), a Los Angeles punk rock band
 Goldfinger (album), the 1996 first album by Goldfinger
 "Goldfinger" (Ash song), 1996
 "Goldfinger", a song by Die Krupps from Volle Kraft voraus!
 "Goldfinger 2019", a song by Japanese musician Koda Kumi

Other uses 
 Goldfinger (surname)
 Goldfinger (dragster), an early slingshot dragster
 Goldfinger banana, a banana cultivar developed in Honduras
 Goldfinger v. Feintuch, a 1930s New York court case concerning secondary boycotts
 Andrew Gilding (born 1970), English darts player with the nickname Goldfinger
 Edge connector, alternatively called "gold fingers"